Julien Médécin (3 November 1894 – 26 January 1986) was a Monegasque architect. He won a bronze medal in Designs for Town Planning at the 1924 Olympics in Paris for his design of the stadium for Monte Carlo in Fonteville with a cycling track, a rugby and football pitch, and a nautical basin.

Career
Julien Médécin was born on November 3, 1984 in Monaco. Both his father François and his brother Marcel were also architects.

Médécin received his architecture diploma from the École des Beaux-arts in Paris in 1921. He returned home to work in Monaco and Nice in the 1930s. Médécin was a student of Gabriel Héraud and Victor Laloux; his work was primarily classified as art deco and modern architecture.

In 1937, Médécin designed the Fondation de Monaco student residence, which is part of the Cité internationale universitaire de Paris campus in Paris. He also designed the Villa Gloriette apartment building in Monaco, which was torn down in the 1960s.

Médécin joined the Société des architectes diplômés du gouvernement (S.A.D.G.) in 1944.

1924 Summer Olympics
Médécin received a bronze medal for his design of the Stadium for Monte Carlo in Monaco at the 1924 Summer Olympics in Paris. As of 2022, he remains the only Monegasque competitor to have won an Olympic medal in any discipline; however, art competition medals are no longer recognized by the International Olympic Committee. As a result, Monaco, which has appeared in 32 Olympic Games as of 2021, holds the mark for the most Olympic appearances without a sporting medal.

References

1894 births
1986 deaths
Olympic bronze medalists in art competitions
Olympic bronze medalists for Monaco
Monegasque architects
Medalists at the 1924 Summer Olympics
Olympic competitors in art competitions